The abandoned NYO&W Port Ben station is located at 24 Towpath Road in the Town of Wawarsing, New York, United States. It is a Tudor Revival style building erected in the early 20th century by the New York, Ontario and Western Railway (O&W). The station was on the O&W's division between Summitville on the O&W main line and Kingston.

Passenger service ended by 1946. Freight trains last operated in 1957 when the O&W was abandoned; the station ceased being used at that time. Despite its age and neglect, the Port Ben station remains intact and is well preserved. In 2000, the station and abandoned right-of-way were listed on the National Register of Historic Places.

Building
The station is in the small community of Port Ben, located a short distance east of the US 209 highway north of Napanoch on the east bank of Rondout Creek at the foot of the Shawangunk Ridge. It is on the northeast edge of Port Ben, a small community of small frame houses and modular and mobile homes. To the immediate east of the station is the empty bed of the Delaware and Hudson Canal, a National Historic Landmark.

The building itself is a single story, two-by-six-bay, wood frame building on a brick foundation with a low pitched gable roof shingled in slate. It is pierced by a brick chimney at the north end. Brackets support its wide overhanging eaves.

It is faced in half-timbered beige stucco on a metal lath. Some of the exterior has been defaced with spraypainted graffiti. Fenestration is irregular, determined by the building's use as a rail station. On the south side is an off-center projecting trainmaster's window and separate passenger and freight doors. The north has square windows in pairs and singled and a freight entrance near the west end. That end has two square windows, one currently boarded up, matched by a passenger entrance and window at the east.

Inside the space is divided into a passenger waiting area, ticket office and freight office. Many of the original finishings remain, including the lath and plaster walls, the varnished wainscoting and door and window surrounds. The electrical switches are still in place, and some coal remains in the bin.

See also

New York, Ontario and Western Railway
National Register of Historic Places listings in Ulster County, New York
Napanoch station, another surviving station on the same branch

References

Former railway stations in New York (state)
National Register of Historic Places in Ulster County, New York
Railway stations on the National Register of Historic Places in New York (state)
Railway stations in the United States opened in 1912
Railway stations closed in 1953
Tudor Revival architecture in New York (state)
Wawarsing, New York
1912 establishments in New York (state)
Former New York, Ontario and Western Railway stations